Caffeine synthase is a methyltransferase enzyme involved in the caffeine biosynthesis pathway. It is expressed in tea species, coffee species, and cocoa species. The enzyme catalyses the following reactions:

 S-adenosyl-L-methionine + theobromine  S-adenosyl-L-homocysteine + caffeine + H+
 S-adenosyl-L-methionine + paraxanthine  S-adenosyl-L-homocysteine + caffeine + H+
 7-methylxanthine + S-adenosyl-L-methionine  S-adenosyl-L-homocysteine + H+ + theobromine

Caffeine synthase is expressed in the Camellia species irrawadiensis, ptilophylla, and sinensis; the Coffea species arabica, and canephora; and in Theobroma cacao.

References 

EC 2.1.1
Caffeine
Camellia